A national reserve in New Zealand is an area that has been designated as having national importance under section 16 of the Reserves Act 1977. They are administered by the Department of Conservation.

Legislation
Section 13 of the Reserves Act 1977 ("Governor-General may declare reserve to be national reserve") deals with national reserves. It is outlined that the governor-general can, through Order in Council (i.e. a process by which a government's decision is given effect) and made on recommendation by the minister (i.e. the Minister of Conservation, as that minister is responsible for the Department of Conservation), declare national reserves.

Existing national reserves
The national reserves include:
Puhi Kai Iti / Cook Landing Site National Historic Reserve, Kaiti, Gisborne – where Captain James Cook first landed in New Zealand in 1769
Hāpūpū / JM Barker Historic Reserve, Chatham Islands – containing Moriori tree carvings
Lewis Pass National Reserve
New Zealand Subantarctic Islands

The Cook Landing Site and Waitangi reserves are small reserves with historic value. The Lewis Pass reserve is much larger (13,737 hectares), with conservation values, including parts with scenic and ecological values. The Subantarctic Islands are collectively a UNESCO World Heritage Site.

Other areas
The area known as the Waitangi National Reserve, where the Treaty of Waitangi was signed, is not a national reserve, despite its name. The area has never been a national reserve (or any other kind of reserve) under the Reserves Act. It has always been administered by the Waitangi National Trust Board under the Waitangi National Trust Board Act 1932.

Takapūneke is the site of an 1830 massacre adjacent to present-day Akaroa. The historical significance has not always been known and in 1960, Akaroa County built a sewage treatment plant in the area that was the core of the kāinga. In 2018, Christchurch City Council asked the Minister of Conservation to declare Takapūneke Reserve a national reserve.

See also
Protected areas of New Zealand

References

Protected areas of New Zealand